Andinia is a genus of flowering plants belonging to the family Orchidaceae.

Its native range is Western South America to Venezuela.

Species:

Andinia ariasiana 
Andinia auriculata 
Andinia bifida 
Andinia cardiocheila 
Andinia catella 
Andinia caveroi 
Andinia chaoae 
Andinia chelosepala 
Andinia chilopsis 
Andinia ciliaris 
Andinia composita 
Andinia cordilabia 
Andinia dactyla 
Andinia dalstroemii 
Andinia dentata 
Andinia destituta 
Andinia dielsii 
Andinia erepsis 
Andinia exigua 
Andinia geminipetala 
Andinia hippocrepica 
Andinia hirtzii 
Andinia hystricosa 
Andinia ibex 
Andinia irrasa 
Andinia lappacea 
Andinia longiserpens 
Andinia lueri 
Andinia lunaris 
Andinia lunatocheila 
Andinia lupula 
Andinia lynniana 
Andinia macrotica 
Andinia masdevalliopsis 
Andinia micropetala 
Andinia mongei 
Andinia monilia 
Andinia montis-rotundi 
Andinia nummularia 
Andinia obesa 
Andinia octocornuta 
Andinia ortiziana 
Andinia panica 
Andinia pendens 
Andinia pensilis 
Andinia pentamytera 
Andinia persimilis 
Andinia phallica 
Andinia pholeter 
Andinia pilosella 
Andinia platysepala 
Andinia pogonion 
Andinia pseudocaulescens 
Andinia ricii 
Andinia rosea 
Andinia rotunda 
Andinia schizopogon 
Andinia sibundoyensis 
Andinia spiralis 
Andinia stalactites 
Andinia sudamericana 
Andinia sunchubambensis 
Andinia tingomariana 
Andinia triangularis 
Andinia trimytera 
Andinia uchucayensis 
Andinia ursula 
Andinia vestigipetala 
Andinia viebrockiana 
Andinia vieira-pereziana 
Andinia villosa 
Andinia werneri 
Andinia xenion

References

Pleurothallidinae
Pleurothallidinae genera